is a tramway stop in Abeno-ku, Osaka, Japan on the Hankai Tramway Uemachi Line.

Layout
A side platform is located on each track, before passing the tramway crossing (Seimei-dōri).

Adjacent stations

Abeno-ku, Osaka
Railway stations in Osaka
Railway stations in Japan opened in 1900